Bertrand 'Bert' Kobayashi is an American politician and a Democratic member of the Hawaii House of Representatives since January 16, 2013 representing District 19.

Elections
2012 When Republican Representative Barbara Marumoto retired and left the District 19 seat open, Kobayashi won the August 11, 2012 Democratic Primary with 3,272 votes (54.5%) against former Representative Brian Yamane, and won the November 6, 2012 General election with 6,749 votes (62.5%) against Republican nominee Darrell Young.

References

External links
Official page at the Hawaii State Legislature
 

Place of birth missing (living people)
Living people
Democratic Party members of the Hawaii House of Representatives
21st-century American politicians
Hawaii politicians of Japanese descent
1944 births